Molly McQuade is an American poet, critic, and editor. Her work
has appeared in The Michigan Quarterly Review,
The Baffler,
The New Criterion,
The Boston Review,
Poetry,
The Paris Review,
and Dædalus.

McQuade has published a poetry collection, Barbarism (2002), as well as a book of nonfiction on poetry, Stealing Glimpses: Of Poetry, Poets, and Things In Between (1999). She is the editor of several anthologies, including One Word: Contemporary Writers on the Words They Love or Loathe (2010),  which received a starred review in Publishers Weekly.

Books
 ed. An Unsentimental Education: Writers and Chicago, University of Chicago Press, 1995
 Stealing Glimpses: Of Poetry, Poets, and Things In Between / Essays, Sarabande Books, 1999
 ed. By Herself: Women Reclaim Poetry, Graywolf Press, 2000
 Barbarism, Four Way Books, 2002
 ed. The Long Meanwhile: Stories of Arrival and Departure, Weighed Words LLC, 2007
ed. One Word: Contemporary Writers on the Words They Love or Loathe, Sarabande Books, 2010

References

External links
 Molly McQuade.

Living people
Year of birth missing (living people)